The 1940 Southampton by-election was held on 27 November 1940.  The by-election was held due to the elevation to the peerage of the incumbent National MP, Sir John Reith.  It was won by the Liberal National candidate Russell Thomas. This was the last uncontested Parliamentary election to date where it resulted in a gain for the winning party.

References

1940 elections in the United Kingdom
1940 in England
20th century in Southampton
November 1940 events
Elections in Southampton
By-elections to the Parliament of the United Kingdom in Hampshire constituencies
Unopposed by-elections to the Parliament of the United Kingdom in English constituencies